Chistoy Banki or Chistaya Banka is an island in the Caspian Sea. It is located off the mouths of the Volga, 27 km south of the southern tip of Zyudev Island.

Chistoy Banki Island has a length of 6 km and a maximum width of 4 km.

Administratively this island belongs to the Astrakhan Oblast of the Russian Federation.

References

Worldmaps

Islands of Astrakhan Oblast
Islands of the Caspian Sea